The 2018 Wrestling World Cup - Men's freestyle was the last of a set of three Wrestling World Cups in 2018 which took place in Iowa City, United States on April 7–8, 2018. This event took place in the main indoor of University of Iowa - Carver–Hawkeye Arena.

In day 1 this event visited  6,388 fans.

Background
Initially the top teams from Russia, Turkey and Iran were to compete in the 2018 World Cup; however were unable to attend, for Turkey had financial difficulties, Russia had visa issues and Iran refused to compete due to a disagreement with the UWW event calendar. Mongolia and India replaced these teams.

Pool stage

Pool A

Pool B

Medal Matches

Final classement

See also
2018 Wrestling World Cup - Men's Greco-Roman
2018 Wrestling World Cup - Women's freestyle

References 
  
 2018 Wrestling World Cup at United World Wrestling

Wrestling World Cup
International wrestling competitions hosted by the United States
Iowa City, Iowa
Wrestling World Cup - Men's freestyle
Wrestling World Cup - Men's freestyle
Wrestling World Cup - Men's freestyle
Wrestling World Cup - Men's freestyle